This is a comprehensive list of victories of the  cycling team. The races are categorized according to the UCI Continental Circuits rules.

2011 –  

 Le Samyn, Dominic Klemme
 Stage 7 Tirreno–Adriatico, Fabian Cancellara
  Overall Critérium International, Fränk Schleck
Stage 1, Fränk Schleck
 E3 Harelbeke, Fabian Cancellara
 Stages 1, 3 & 5 Circuit de la Sarthe, Daniele Bennati
 Stage 5 Bayern Rundfahrt, Giacomo Nizzolo
  Overall Tour de Luxembourg, Linus Gerdemann
Prologue (ITT), Fabian Cancellara
Stage 2, Linus Gerdemann
 Stages 1 & 9 Tour de Suisse, Fabian Cancellara
  Road Race Championships, Robert Wagner
  Road Race Championships, Fabian Cancellara
  Road Race Championships, Fränk Schleck
 Stage 8 Tour of Austria, Daniele Bennati
 Stage 18 Tour de France, Andy Schleck
 Stage 3 Tour de Wallonie, Daniele Bennati
 Stage 3 Danmark Rundt, Jakob Fuglsang
 Stage 20 Vuelta a España, Daniele Bennati
 Binche–Tournai–Binche, Rüdiger Selig
 Giro di Lombardia, Oliver Zaugg

2012 –  

  Road Race Championships, Laurent Didier
  Time Trial Championships, Jakob Fuglsang
  Time Trial Championships, Fabian Cancellara
 Strade Bianche, Fabian Cancellara
 Stage 7 (ITT) Tirreno–Adriatico, Fabian Cancellara
  Overall Tour de Luxembourg, Jakob Fuglsang
 Team classification Tour de France
Prologue (ITT), Fabian Cancellara
  Overall Tour of Austria, Jakob Fuglsang
Stage 4, Jakob Fuglsang
  Overall Tour de Wallonie, Giacomo Nizzolo
Stage 3, Giacomo Nizzolo
 Stage 5 Eneco Tour, Giacomo Nizzolo
 Stage 3 Tour du Poitou-Charentes, Giacomo Nizzolo
 Stage 4 USA Pro Cycling Challenge, Jens Voigt
 Stage 18 Vuelta a España, Daniele Bennati

2013 –  

  National Road Race Championships, Hayden Roulston
 Gran Premio Nobili Rubinetterie, Bob Jungels
 E3 Harelbeke, Fabian Cancellara
 Tour of Flanders, Fabian Cancellara
 Paris–Roubaix, Fabian Cancellara
 Stage 5 Tour of California, Jens Voigt
 Stage 6 Tour de Suisse, Grégory Rast
 Stages 2 & 3 Tour de Luxembourg, Giacomo Nizzolo
 Stage 4 Tour de Luxembourg, Bob Jungels
  National Time Trial Championships, Fabian Cancellara
  National Time Trial Championships, Bob Jungels
  National Road Race Championships, Stijn Devolder
  National Road Race Championships, Robert Kišerlovski
  National Road Race Championships, Bob Jungels
 Stage 2 Tour de France, Jan Bakelants
 Stage 7 (ITT) Tour of Austria, Fabian Cancellara
 Clásica de San Sebastián, Tony Gallopin
 Stage 5 Tour of Utah, Chris Horner
  Overall Vuelta a España, Chris Horner
 Combination classification, Chris Horner
Stages 3 & 10, Chris Horner
Stage 11 (ITT), Fabian Cancellara

2014 –  

  National Road Race Championships, Hayden Roulston
 Stages 2 & 6 Tour de San Luis, Julián Arredondo
 Stage 3 Tour de San Luis, Giacomo Nizzolo
 Stage 1 Driedaagse van West-Vlaanderen, Danny van Poppel
 Tour of Flanders, Fabian Cancellara
  National Time Trial Championships, Kristof Vandewalle
  Mountains classification Giro d'Italia, Julián Arredondo
Stage 18, Julián Arredondo
 Prologue (ITT) Tour de Luxembourg, Danny van Poppel
  National Time Trial Championships, Fabian Cancellara
  National Time Trial Championships, Laurent Didier
  National Time Trial Championships, Fumiyuki Beppu
  National Road Race Championships, Riccardo Zoidl
  National Road Race Championships, Fränk Schleck
 Stage 5 Tour of Austria, Jesse Sergent
 Stage 7 (ITT) Tour of Austria, Kristof Vandewalle
 Stage 2 Tour de Wallonie, Giacomo Nizzolo
 Stage 7 (ITT) Tour de Pologne, Kristof Vandewalle
 Stage 5 USA Pro Cycling Challenge, Laurent Didier

2015 –  

 Stage 2 Tour of Oman, Fabian Cancellara
  Overall Étoile de Bessèges, Bob Jungels
Stage 5 (ITT), Bob Jungels
 Stage 2 Driedaagse van West-Vlaanderen, Danny van Poppel
 Stage 7 (ITT) Tirreno–Adriatico, Fabian Cancellara
 Gran Premio Nobili Rubinetterie, Giacomo Nizzolo
 Stage 2 (ITT) Critérium International, Fabio Felline
 Stage 2 Tour of the Basque Country, Fabio Felline
  National Road Race Championships, Matthew Busche
  Points classification Giro d'Italia, Giacomo Nizzolo
  National Time Trial Championships, Bob Jungels
  National Road Race Championships, Bob Jungels
 Stages 2 & 5 Tour de Wallonie, Danny van Poppel
 Stage 8 Vuelta a España, Jasper Stuyven
 Stage 12 Vuelta a España, Danny van Poppel
 Grand Prix de Fourmies, Fabio Felline
 Stage 16 Vuelta a España, Fränk Schleck
  Overall Tour of Alberta, Bauke Mollema
Stage 1, Team time trial
 Japan Cup, Bauke Mollema

2016 –  

  National Road Race Championships, Jack Bobridge
 Trofeo Serra de Tramuntana, Fabian Cancellara
 Stage 3 (ITT) Volta ao Algarve, Fabian Cancellara
 Kuurne–Brussels–Kuurne, Jasper Stuyven
 Strade Bianche, Fabian Cancellara
 Stage 7 Tirreno–Adriatico, Fabian Cancellara
 Stages 1 & 3 Tour of Croatia, Giacomo Nizzolo
 Stages 4 Tour of Croatia, Riccardo Zoidl
 Stage 1 Tour of Belgium, Edward Theuns
  Points classification Giro d'Italia, Giacomo Nizzolo
 GP du canton d'Argovie, Giacomo Nizzolo
 Stage 1 (ITT) Tour de Suisse, Fabian Cancellara
  National Time Trial Championships, Fabian Cancellara
  National Road Race Championships, Giacomo Nizzolo
 Stage 3 Tour de Pologne, Niccolò Bonifazio
 Clásica de San Sebastián, Bauke Mollema
  Olympic Men's Time Trial, Fabian Cancellara
  Points classification Vuelta a España, Fabio Felline
 Gran Piemonte, Giacomo Nizzolo

2017 –  

  Overall Vuelta a San Juan, Bauke Mollema
 Stage 3 Dubai Tour, John Degenkolb
  Time Trial Championships, Jarlinson Pantano
 Prologue (ITT) Tour de Romandie, Fabio Felline
 Stage 3 (ITT) Tour of Belgium, Matthias Brändle
 Stage 2 Hammer Sportzone Limburg
  Road Race Championships, Ruben Guerreiro
  Road Race Championships, Mads Pedersen
 Stage 15 Tour de France, Bauke Mollema
 Stage 4 BinckBank Tour, Edward Theuns
 Stage 7 BinckBank Tour, Jasper Stuyven
 Stage 20 Vuelta a España, Alberto Contador
  Overall Tour du Poitou-Charentes, Mads Pedersen
Stage 3, Mads Pedersen
Stage 4 (ITT), Matthias Brändle
 Stage 6 Tour of Turkey, Edward Theuns

2018 –  

 Stage 3 (ITT) Vuelta a San Juan, Ryan Mullen
 Trofeo Campos, Porreres, Felanitx, Ses Salines, John Degenkolb
 Trofeo Lloseta – Andratx, Toms Skujiņš
 Trofeo Palma, John Degenkolb
 Stage 7 Vuelta a San Juan, Giacomo Nizzolo
 Stage 2 Herald Sun Tour, Mads Pedersen
 Stage 5 Volta a Catalunya, Jarlinson Pantano
 Stage 2 Settimana Internazionale di Coppi e Bartali, Bauke Mollema
 Stage 3 Tour of California, Toms Skujiņš
 Fyen Rundt, Mads Pedersen
  National Time Trial Championships, Tsgabu Grmay
  National Time Trial Championships, Ryan Mullen
  National Time Trial Championships, Toms Skujiņš
 Stage 9 Tour de France, John Degenkolb
 Stage 4 BinckBank Tour, Jasper Stuyven
 Grand Prix de Wallonie, Jasper Stuyven
 Grote Prijs Jef Scherens – Rondom Leuven, Jasper Stuyven
 Tour de l'Eurométropole, Mads Pedersen
 Gran Premio Bruno Beghelli, Bauke Mollema 
 Tre Valli Varesine, Toms Skujiņš

2019 –  

 Stage 6 Tour Down Under, Richie Porte
 Stage 4 Tour La Provence, John Degenkolb
 Stage 2 Tour du Haut Var, Giulio Ciccone
  Mountains classification Giro d'Italia, Giulio Ciccone
Stage 16, Giulio Ciccone
  National Time Trial Championships, Ryan Mullen
  National Road Race Championships, Toms Skujiņš
  Overall Deutschland Tour, Jasper Stuyven
 Grand Prix Impanis-Van Petegem, Edward Theuns
 Grand Prix d'Isbergues – Pas de Calais, Mads Pedersen
  World Road Race, Mads Pedersen
 Il Lombardia, Bauke Mollema
 Japan Cup, Bauke Mollema

2020 –  

  Overall Tour Down Under, Richie Porte
Stage 3, Richie Porte
 Trofeo Campos, Porreres, Felanitx, Ses Salines, Matteo Moschetti
 Trofeo de Playa de Palma-Palma, Matteo Moschetti
 Stage 3 Tour du Haut Var, Julien Bernard
 Omloop Het Nieuwsblad, Jasper Stuyven
 Stage 2 Tour de Pologne, Mads Pedersen
  National U23 Time Trial Championships, Michel Ries
 Stage 3 BinckBank Tour, Mads Pedersen
 Gent–Wevelgem, Mads Pedersen

2021 –  

  Overall Tour des Alpes-Maritimes et du Var, Gianluca Brambilla
Stage 1, Bauke Mollema
Stage 3, Gianluca Brambilla
 Kuurne–Brussels–Kuurne, Mads Pedersen
 Trofeo Laigueglia, Bauke Mollema
 Milan–San Remo, Jasper Stuyven
 Per sempre Alfredo, Matteo Moschetti
 Stage 5 Tour de Hongrie, Edward Theuns
  National Time Trial Championships, Toms Skujiņš
  National Road Race Championships, Toms Skujiņš
 Stage 14 Tour de France, Bauke Mollema
  Overall Tour de Wallonie, Quinn Simmons
Stage 3, Quinn Simmons
 Stage 2 Danmark Rundt, Mads Pedersen
 Stage 3 Tour of Norway, Mads Pedersen
  National Time Trial Championships, Ryan Mullen
  Overall Giro di Sicilia, Vincenzo Nibali
Stage 4, Vincenzo Nibali
  National Road Race Championships, Ryan Mullen

2022 –  

 Stage 1 Étoile de Bessèges, Mads Pedersen
 Stage 4 Volta a la Comunitat Valenciana, Matteo Moschetti
 Stage 3 Paris–Nice, Mads Pedersen
 Stages 1 & 3 Circuit de la Sarthe, Mads Pedersen
 Stage 2 International Tour of Hellas, Matteo Moschetti
 Stage 5 Tour de Hongrie, Antonio Tiberi
 Stage 15 Giro d'Italia, Giulio Ciccone
 Stage 1 Tour of Belgium, Mads Pedersen
  National Time Trial Championships, Toms Skujiņš
  National Time Trial Championships, Bauke Mollema
  National Road Race Championships, Emīls Liepiņš
  National Road Race Championships, Alexander Kamp
 Stage 13 Tour de France, Mads Pedersen
  Points classification,  Vuelta a España, Mads Pedersen
Stages 13, 16 & 19, Mads Pedersen
  Overall Tour de Luxembourg, Mattias Skjelmose Jensen
Stage 4 (ITT), Mattias Skjelmose Jensen

2023 –  

 Stage 3 Vuelta a San Juan, Quinn Simmons
 Stage 2 Volta a la Comunitat Valenciana, Giulio Ciccone
 Stage 4 Étoile de Bessèges, Mattias Skjelmose Jensen
 Stage 5 (ITT) Étoile de Bessèges, Mads Pedersen
 Stage 2 Tour des Alpes-Maritimes et du Var, Mattias Skjelmose Jensen
 Stage 2 Paris–Nice, Mads Pedersen

Supplementary statistics 

Sources

Notes

References 

Wins
Leopard